The Three-Body Problem in Minecraft is a Chinese network animated series based on the science fiction novels The Three-Body Problem and The Dark Forest by Liu Cixin. Initially, the animation was a doujin work, but from the second season onwards, it became an official adaptation.

Production
The animation's director, Li Zhenyi (李圳宜), is a student studying at the University of Pau and the Adour Region and a fan of the Three-Body Problem. As he was often asked about the novel, he decided to use Minecraft to make an animated adaption of the work. When he made the first episode, he was the only person involved aside from the voice actors, so he needed to adapt the screenplay, perform auditions, and design the levels. Due to technical, experience and financial constraints, the first season was relatively unprofessional, but nevertheless managed to attract others to help work on the production. After the fourth episode, the creators set up a production team, and after the ninth, they all converted to animation production.

With the debut of the second season, quality was further increased, with the addition of lighting and character expressions. It also became an official adaptation, allowing the team to receive financial support and official licensing from the publishers of the original novel.

Seasons

The average episode lasts about 20 minutes.

During the first season, there was a six-month gap between episodes 10 and 11. After the second episode of season two, updates were discontinued for a long time, before broadcasting began again in January 2018.

Reception
Critical reception was largely positive. On the Chinese social website Douban and video website Bilibili, the animation received an overall rating of 9.7/10.

According to the People's Daily, the creators' animation, voice-over work, scene design, and editing manages use the video-game-style pixel art into a production with a quality similar to sci-fi movies. They also commended the quality of the animation, especially in the third season. The Paper also praised it, stating that since the production team were fans of the original novel, they could preserve the details that made it appealing, and make the adapted plot compelling and rich.

In 2015, the production team was awarded the Silver Prize of the Xingyun Awards.

Outside of China, users have uploaded the series onto YouTube, putting each season onto a playlist.

References

Minecraft in popular culture
2014 Chinese television series debuts
Chinese animated television series
Television shows based on Chinese novels